The United States Ambassador to Sweden serves as the official diplomatic representative of the President and the Government of the United States of America to the King and the Government of the Kingdom of Sweden. Diplomatic relations between Sweden and the United States began with the signing of the Treaty of Amity and Commerce in 1783. Sweden received its first U.S. resident minister in 1814, but in 1818, the senior U.S. diplomat again became the chargé d'affaires. In 1854, the senior American diplomat in Sweden again became the minister resident. From 1814 to 1905 the United States Chief of Mission in Sweden also represented United States interests with respect to Norway, as Norway was aligned with Sweden during this period in the Union between Sweden and Norway. 

The contemporary tendency of American presidents is to appoint fundraisers or prominent campaign supporters to the ambassador's post in Sweden, rather than promoting career members of the United States Foreign Service. The current ambassador is Erik Ramanathan, who presented his credentials on January 20, 2022.

Residence

Since the 1930s, the ambassador is resident in the ambassadorial residence, Villa Åkerlund, of the United States Embassy in Diplomatstaden, Stockholm.

List of American Chiefs of Mission to Sweden

18th century

1814–1854 (Non-Resident Minister)

1854–1885 (Minister Resident)

1885–1947 (Envoy Extraordinary and Minister Plenipotentiary)

1947–present day (Ambassador Extraordinary and Plenipotentiary)

Notes

See also
Foreign relations of Sweden
Foreign relations of the United States

References
United States Department of State: Background notes on Sweden

External links
 United States Department of State: Chiefs of Mission for Sweden
 United States Department of State: Sweden
 United States Embassy in Stockholm

Sweden
 
United States